Saint Leo of Montefeltro (c. 275–366) otherwise Leone of Montefeltro was the first bishop of Montefeltro from 301. He is traditionally held to have been in origin a stonecutter from Dalmatia. He is venerated as a saint by the Roman Catholic church. His feast day is 1 August.

References

270s births
366 deaths
4th-century bishops in Roman Dalmatia
Bishops of Montefeltro
Saints from Roman Italy
4th-century Christian saints